Nikki Hornsby is an American musician. She has been active in the pop, Americana, country, and blues genres as a songwriter, singer, and guitarist. She is a Broadcast Music, Inc. associated songwriter and has written over 1000 songs.

Early life, family and education
Nikki Hornsby was born in Long Beach, California and grew up in Burke, Fairfax County of Northern Virginia. She is the granddaughter of Columbia Records artist, musician, singer-songwriter Dan Hornsby, and her family association with songwriter Jimmy Van Heusen influenced her at a young age. She earned her first guitar at age ten by selling flower seeds door-to-door in the countryside. Her formal music lessons were in piano, accordion, and three years as a cornet trumpet player in Edgar Allen Poe, Annandale Virginia junior high school band. 

As a young teenager, Hornsby was contacted to perform as a solo singer and guitar artist representing her boarding school Fairfax Hall, Waynesboro Virginia at social events, hospitals, and TV broadcasts. She was paid to perform by Gulf Corporation at Lake Anne Reston square in Reston, Virginia for a solo outdoor concert.

After graduating Fairfax Hall School, Hornsby attended Sacred Heart College and Belmont Abbey College in North Carolina full-time for three years while performing at the Sheraton Hotels and Resorts Lounge in Charlotte and other North Carolina clubs. She majored in Psychology and Theology. She transferred to George Mason University in Northern Virginia and continued accepting contracts for solo work as a singer and Musicians Union Local Washington D.C. Chapter guitarist. She worked as a stand-up singer in a combo or duo with other professional union musicians.

Career

1970s 
In the early 1970s, Hornsby was the first female singer-guitar player performing on the Auto Train that traveled from Lorton, Virginia to Sanford, Florida. She was contracted as a stand-up singer with a union piano player that she met on the auto train. She also worked with some other local union musicians in clubs in Washington DC. Chris Marchant, a union piano player she met on the Auto-Train, asked her to work as a stand up singer in the surrounding area, including Lucky Pierre's Lounge at L'Enfant Plaza and in the main cocktail lounge of the Watergate complex.

In the mid-1970s, Hornsby moved back to California and worked full-time as a club performer. She played at many clubs in the South Bay area of Los Angeles, like Portofino Inn, Blue Moon Saloon, Holiday Inn, Red Onion, and Queensway Bay Hilton.

1980s 

Hornsby from working music full time purchased a home in Lomita, California in 1980.

Later in the 1980s, Hornsby received a financial backing offer from a Lomita business owner, Ken Herbert, to record her original songs under her own record label CJP-NHRecords. Shortly after, Hornsby marketed her music to commercial radio stations and trade magazines throughout Europe and in the United States.

Only a few of Hornsby's original songs from hundreds of performed songs were recorded and released for airplay on commercial radio stations in the US and Europe. In Mallorca, Spain, the "ACM Newsletter" as well as other print publications noted Hornsby's song "One Way Ticket" as number one. During that same time "Hungry For Love", "Let Me Take You on a Dream" and "Hot Talkin’ Big Shot" were airplayed in Europe. All four songs reached the top ten on commercial radio station charts.

In 1988, she was named Female Singer of the Year in Scandinavia. In 1989, "Shoe String and a Prayer" charted Top 5 in the USA IRC (independent) country singles, as well as in the Cash Box Top 100 USA National commercial radio programming charts.

1990s 
In the 1990s, "Shoestring and a Prayer" obtained USA radio airplay from independent and major commercial radio stations as well as commercial music trade publications. "Shoestring and a Prayer" was No.1 the entire month of August on the Music Review Top 30 Independent Chart, NY, No.3 in the Top 30 (IRC) Debut Independent Radio Chart, Nashville, TN, No.11 on the Cash Box Independent Chart, and No.14 Indie Bullet Mag. Top 100 Chart, Tyler, TX. Nikki Hornsby was nominated in the music and lyric composition category to the Board of Directors of the Academy of Country Music (ACM) four different times in the 1990s.

In the 1990s, she recorded as a solo singer-songwriter with Steve Duncan (Desert Rose Band), Jack Daniels (Hwy 101 Band), Jay Dee Manness (Desert Rose Band), John Jorgensen (Desert Rose Band), and Al Bruno who was a multi-year ACM award-winning guitarist (CA Country Music News, San Jose, CA Vol 2 No.20, Pg 9, April 1991).

Hornsby Nikki Hornsby was nominated four different years (official Academy of Country Music Ballot, composer category, 1991, 1992, 1994) for a position on the ACM's board of directors.

2000-2006 

In late 2004, Hornsby co-produced and arranged ten original songs on a CJP-NHRecords CD called Just Wait with Marty Rifkin.

Hornsby traveled to many countries in Europe from end of 2004 to 2007 test marketing Just Wait along with other original songs. This was done so CJP-NHRecords would release Just Wait for airplay.

In 2006, Hornsby performed the break out song from Just Wait called "Money's Worth" at the International Automobile Associations Annual International Event in Frankfurt, Germany. Truck Radio reported this song as number one on the Truck Radio European Charts.

That same year, a commercial radio station, Radio Eurohertz in Eastern Germany near the Czech Republic border, invited Hornsby to perform a live three-hour show of her original music.

In 2006, Hornsby's song "This IS America", written for Joan Milke Flores from Just Wait, was broadcast for the warm up game of USA vs. Italy at the International World Cup Soccer Games. Hornsby was one of the VIP Hosts for Kaiserslautern, Germany's tourist center for the six games of the FIFA World Cup Soccer Championship held in 2006.

Hornsby appeared on the Spanish TV channel IB3 in April 2006. She also performed original songs, including songs she wrote in other languages like "Yo Tengo Un Amor", on commercial radio telecasts in Palma. She did on-air live interviews at different radio stations like Una Radio, Radio Balear, Ultima Hora and Punto Radio in Spain that same week in April 2006.

A European Military Community VIP base pass in June 2006 allowed access for Hornsby while she was in Europe and she volunteered to play guitar and sing at the Kaiserslautern Germany Daenner Kaserne Chapel weekly for the military community church services for the Kaiserslautern Military Community. At the end of 2006, an administrator at the Vogelweh Community Center's main office told Hornsby there was a two-year waiting list for music and vocal instructions and asked her to help at the community center for US military personnel and their families. In response, she began to provide one-on-one instructions with the Nikki Hornsby beginning acoustic guitar and vocal method.

She also judged in US Air Force Idol Talent Contest. A US Army General Thorpe wrote a letter of recommendation for Hornsby's supporting the European military community.

At the end of 2006, Hornsby joined the National Academy of Recording Arts and Sciences (NARAS) as a voting member. Hornsby has voted over ten years for the Grammy Awards.

2006–present 
In 2007, the NARAS committee placed songs from Just Wait on the first ballot in 8 different categories.

In 2007 during Grammy week, Hornsby travelled Los Angeles, California for appointments and networking. She was injured in an international airplane in-flight accident February 8, 2007. She was unable to continue to write, record, or professionally perform her music afterwards and soon returned home to Los Angeles.

In 2009, CJP-NHRecords released Just Wait Instrumentally, the instrumental version of the 2006 album Just Wait.

In 2014–2015, CJP-NHRecords released one pop dance and two pop orchestral singles of Hornsby music and lyrics from collaborative work. These three Hornsby pop singles were listed first ballot 2014 in the arrangement, instruments and vocal category of the 57th Grammy TV awards process for 2015. An original song “Just Lovin’ You” was covered as an uptempo dance tune by a singer recording artist, Zita, in Austria Europe but translated into German in 2014. 

In July 2020 for a live IB3-TV show in Mallorca, Spain, CJP-NHRecords released and published performances of a medley of “Red Roses On The Floor” and “Yo Tengo Un Amor”.

Nikki Hornsby and the Rangers
Hornsby formed her back up band "Nikki Hornsby and the Rangers" for various events with professional musicians. As the leader of the band, she performed in many annual concerts and at local Southern California venues including Alpine Village in Torrance. Hornsby did all the contract bookings and travel arrangements. In August 1991, Nikki Hornsby and the Rangers performed at Redondo Beach's Summer Concert in the Park. She with her back up band were booked for many consecutive years in the Redondo Beach Concerts On The Pier series.

TV appearances
In the early 1990s, Nikki Hornsby appeared as a solo folk singer guitarist on the final show of Fox Network's "Parker Lewis Can't Lose".

Hornsby acted as a judge for the California Country Music Awards and as a Music Industry Talent Judge for the National Colgate Talent Roundup from the 1990s until 2003. Hornsby has been a consultant to the music industry since she obtained the business license in 1989.

Laura Schlessinger used Hornsby's song, "Hot Talkin' Big Shot", for several years on The Dr. Laura radio program as cue music and also for a national radio commercial advertising Schlessinger's radio show.

Samples of music

Discography

References

Sources
 AllMusic website article by Joslyn Layne 2009

External links

 CJP-NHRecords website
 Billboard.com: Nikki Hornsby listed Billboard
 A List of previous paid performances
 Nikki Hornsby on IAA TV Frankfurt
 Nikki Hornsby Broadcast Music Inc. BMI website listing

Living people
20th-century American women singers
21st-century American women singers
American country singer-songwriters
American women country singers
American women pop singers
American women singer-songwriters
American women record producers
Country musicians from California
Record producers from California
Singer-songwriters from California
Year of birth missing (living people)
20th-century American singers
21st-century American singers